William Andrew "Bill" Waiser  (born 1953) is a Canadian historian specializing in western and northern Canadian history.

Career and honours
Waiser grew up in Toronto but developed an interest in western Canadian history visiting his grandparents' Manitoba homestead each summer. He went on to study history at Trent University under renowned Manitoba historian W. L. Morton. Waiser completed his graduate work at the University of Saskatchewan and ultimately joined the Department of History there in 1984. He served as department head from 1995 to 1998. He was Yukon Historian for the Canadian Parks Service prior to his university appointment. He was named the university's Distinguished Researcher at the spring 2004 convocation and received the College of Arts and Science Teaching Excellence Award in 2003. He was awarded the Saskatchewan Order of Merit, the province's highest honour, in 2006, and elected a fellow of the Royal Society of Canada the following year. Bill retired in 2014 from the university. He was invested as a Member of the Order of Canada in 2018. In 2020, Waiser was honoured with a lifetime achievement award for Prairie history by the Canadian Historical Association (CHA).

Waiser's books have won numerous awards. All Hell Can't Stop Us: The On-to-Ottawa Trek and Regina Riot won the 2003 Saskatchewan Book Award (SBA) for non-fiction. His centennial history of Saskatchewan, Saskatchewan: A New History, won the CHA's 2006 Clio Prize as the best book in Prairie History. A World We Have Lost: Saskatchewan Before 1905 won the 2016 Governor General's Literary Award for Non-Fiction as well as that year's SBA non-fiction award. He had previously been nominated for the award in 1997 for Loyal till Death: Indians and the North-West Rebellion, co-written with Blair Stonechild.

Selected works

 In Search of Almighty Voice: Resistance and Reconciliation (Markham: Fifth House Publishers, 2020)
 A World We Have Lost: Saskatchewan Before 1905 (Markham: Fifth House Publishers, 2016)
 Tommy's Team: The People Behind the Douglas Years, with Stuart Houston (Calgary: Fifth House Publishers, 2010)
 Who Killed Jackie Bates? Murder and Mercy during the Great Depression (Calgary: Fifth House Publishers, 2008)
 Saskatchewan: A New History (Calgary: Fifth House Publishers, 2005)
 All Hell Can't Stop Us: The On-to-Ottawa Trek and Regina Riot (Calgary: Fifth House Publishers, 2003)
 Loyal till Death: Indians and the North-West Rebellion, with Blair Stonechild (Calgary: Fifth House Publishers, 1997)
 Park Prisoners: The Untold Story of Western Canada's National Parks (Saskatoon: Fifth House Publishers, 1995)
 Saskatchewan's Playground: A History of Prince Albert National Park (Saskatoon: Fifth House Publishers, 1989)

References

External links

 
 Former website

1953 births
20th-century Canadian historians
21st-century Canadian historians
Canadian male non-fiction writers
Fellows of the Royal Society of Canada
Governor General's Award-winning non-fiction writers
Living people
Members of the Saskatchewan Order of Merit
Trent University alumni
University of Saskatchewan alumni
Academic staff of the University of Saskatchewan
Writers from Saskatchewan